Trinity Christian School (TCS) is a fully-accredited, non-denominational, preschool through 12th grade, private Christian school in Sharpsburg, GA. Bordering Fayette and Coweta counties, Trinity currently enrolls over 1,600 students as of the 2022 - 2023 school year. In addition to our strong academics, including honors and college prep courses, students may choose from a variety of extracurricular activities, and a full range of boys’ and girls’ competitive athletic programs. Celebrating more than 25 years in the Coweta and Fayette County area, Trinity Christian School continues to grow and has exciting plans for expansion to meet the needs of our growing student body.

Trinity Christian School is accredited by Cognia (formerly AdvancEd). In addition, TCS is a member of the International League of Christian Schools (ILCS). These affiliations qualify our students to be eligible for state scholarships and ensures credit recognition to any college or school in the country. TCS is also a member of the Georgia High School Association.

History 
In the fall of 1991, Fayette Fellowship (now Trinity Church) began a Christian preschool with the early goals of affordability, excellence, and genuine Christian care in an educational environment that saw each student as “a special gift from God.” Through prayer, sacrifice, and perseverance, a ministry to children that would profoundly affect the lives of hundreds of Coweta and Fayette county families started to grow. By 1994, an elementary school offering kindergarten through third grade was offered.

Although the school did little advertising, families began sharing with their friends about their satisfaction with a school that offered quality academic instruction with strong Christian values and affordable tuition. With Trinity Church's support, oversight, and facilities, TCS continued adding grade levels and hiring competent, committed Christian teachers and staff.

The present elementary building was constructed and occupied in 1999 to provide necessary classroom space for the rapid growth. It quickly reached capacity, leading to the 2004 construction of the Newton Center, a building which included 12 new classrooms, a large gymnasium, fellowship hall/cafeteria, and facilities for the growing music, sports, drama and P.E. programs. This expansion also accommodated the first high school class in the fall of 2005.

In August 2009, grades 8–12 were relocated to the original campus of Crossroads Church to accommodate increased high school growth. High school classrooms were housed in the sanctuary building while The Hanger provided space for lunch and P.E. classes. Modular units were utilized for special meeting rooms and additional classroom space.

In August 2012, a new middle school building was completed at TCS’ main campus and now houses 6th–8th grades, which allowed for expanded growth in the elementary school.

In October 2018, a state-of-the-art high school building was completed and all of our students were combined onto the same campus for the first time in nearly 10 years.

In 2022, TCS expanded its reach by joining forces with Griffin Christian School in Griffin, GA to form Trinity Christian School Griffin (TCSG). Combined with a student enrollment of more than 300 students at TCSG, the total enrollment across both campuses is over 1,900.

Beliefs 
We believe the Bible to be the inspired—the only infallible, authoritative, inerrant—Word of God. (2 Timothy 3:15, 2 Peter 1:21)

We believe there is one God, eternally existent in three persons: Father, Son, and Holy Spirit. (Genesis 1:1, Matthew 28:1, John 10:30)

We believe in the deity of Christ (John 10:33); His virgin birth (Isaiah 7:14, Matthew 1:23, Luke 1:35); His sinless life (Hebrews 4:15, Hebrews 7:25); His miracles (John 2:11); His vicarious and atoning death (1 Corinthians 15:3, Ephesians 1:7, Hebrews 2:9); His resurrection (John 11:25, 1 Corinthians 15:4); His ascension to the right hand of the Father (Mark 16:19); and His personal return in power and glory (Acts 1:11, Revelation 19:11).

We believe in the absolute necessity of regeneration by the Holy Spirit for salvation because of the exceeding sinfulness of human nature; and that men are justified on the single ground of faith in the shed blood of Christ and that only by God's grace and through faith alone we are saved. (John 3:16-19, John 5:24, Romans 3:23, Romans 5:8,9, Ephesians 2:8-10, Titus 3:5)

We believe in the resurrection of both the saved and the lost; they that are saved unto the resurrection of life, and they that are lost unto the resurrection of damnation. (John 5:28-29)

We believe in the spiritual unity of believers in our Lord Jesus Christ. (Romans 8:9, 1 Corinthians 12:12-13, Galatians 3:26-28)

We believe in the present ministry of the Holy Spirit by whose indwelling the Christian is enabled to live a Godly life. (Romans 8:13-14, 1 Corinthians 3:16, 1 Corinthians 6:19-20, Ephesians 4:30, Ephesians 5:18)

References

External links
 

Christian schools in Georgia (U.S. state)
Schools in Coweta County, Georgia
Private high schools in Georgia (U.S. state)
Private middle schools in Georgia (U.S. state)
Private elementary schools in Georgia (U.S. state)